Methodist Episcopal Church, currently known as the United Methodist Church in Madison, is a historic church at 24 Madison Avenue in Madison, Morris County, New Jersey, United States.

United Methodist Church in Madison is following the belief of Methodism, which is originated from Church of England.

Their mission statement:"Inspired by the life and teachings of Jesus, we welcome all to be nourished for life's journey through worship, community, and service". Their core values:  Worship; Community; Service/Social Action; Intergenerational Spiritual; Formation; Diversity; Drew/UMC Connection.

Although the congregation was formed in 1843, the current Romanesque architecture was built in 1870 by Stephen Decatur Hatch. It was added to the National Register in 2008.

History: After several relocations around Madison, property was given to the Methodists by Daniel Drew located next to the Drew University Campus in 1867. This would become the new location of the church and parsonage. Later the church was dedicated in 1871. In the following years, the church was remodeled and a chapel was added in 1890.

Architecture: Methodist Episcopal church's wall is decorated with stained glass, an ornament used in western buildings for generating radiant lights due to light reflection.

Although the congregation was formed in 1843, the current Romanesque architecture was built in 1870 by Stephen Decatur Hatch. It was added to the National Register in 2008.

Inside of the Church: Pipe Organ, a keyboard instrument of one or more pipe divisions or other means for producing tones.

Activities Around the Church:

The famous Madison Farmer Market, sponsored by the Madison Urban Development Commission, sells fresh produce each year. And Madison May Day is a labor Day dedicated to the city.

References

Madison, New Jersey
Methodist churches in New Jersey
Churches on the National Register of Historic Places in New Jersey
Churches completed in 1870
19th-century Methodist church buildings in the United States
Churches in Morris County, New Jersey
National Register of Historic Places in Morris County, New Jersey
New Jersey Register of Historic Places
Methodist Episcopal churches in the United States